Jaleswar is a Vidhan Sabha constituency of Balasore district, Odisha.

Area of this constituency includes Jaleswar, Jaleswar block and 11 GPs (Natakata, Purusottampur, Kulida, Santoshpur, Raghunathpur, Chormara, Singla, Paunsakulli, Tadada, Putura and Nabara) of Basta block.

In 2009 election, Indian National Congress candidate Debi Prasanna Chand defeated Bharatiya Janata Party candidate Aswini Kumar Patra by a margin of 6,304 votes.

Elected Members

15 elections held during 1951 to 2014. Elected members from the Jaleswar constituency are:
2019: (36): Aswini Kumar Patra (Biju Janata Dal)
2014: (36): Aswini Kumar Patra (Biju Janata Dal)
2009: (36): Debi Prasanna Chand (Congress)
2004: (12): Ashwini Kumar Patra (BJP)
2000: (12): Jaynarayan Mohanty (Congress)
1995: (12): Jaynarayan Mohanty (Congress)
1990: (12): Aswini Kumar Patra (Janata Dal)
1985: (12): Judhisthira Jena (Congress)
1980: (12): Gadadhar Giri (CPI)
1977: (12): Gadadhar Giri (CPI)
1974: (12): Gadadhar Giri (CPI)
1971: (12): Prasanna Kumar Pal(CPI)
1967: (12): Prasanna Kumar Pal (CPI)
1961: (129): Prasanna Kumar Pal (CPI)
1957: (92): Prasanna Kumar Pal (Praja Socialist Party)
1951: (51): Karunakar Panigrahi (Congress)

2019 Election Result

2014 Election Result
In 2014 election, Biju Janata Dal candidate Aswini Kumar Patra defeated Indian National Congress candidate Debiprasanna Chand by a margin of 33,860 votes.

Summary of results of the 2009 Election

Notes

References

Assembly constituencies of Odisha
Balasore district